Antoni Janusz Porowski (born March 14, 1984) is a Canadian television personality, cook, actor, model and author. He is the food and wine expert on the Netflix series Queer Eye (2018–present).

Early life
Porowski was born in Montreal, Quebec, to Polish parents after they emigrated to Canada with his two older sisters. His father is a physician. He grew up speaking Polish, English and French. He and his parents moved to Glade Springs, West Virginia, when he was twelve; he resided there and in Montreal throughout his high school years before returning to Montreal to complete his post-secondary education at Marianopolis College.

After graduating from Concordia University with a bachelor's degree in psychology, Porowski moved to New York City to study acting at the Neighborhood Playhouse School of the Theatre, from which he graduated in 2011. He taught himself to cook by referring to his grandmother's cooking techniques.

Career
Upon moving to New York City, Porowski began auditioning for various acting roles. He has stated that his Polish last name made it difficult for him to find work, which at the time made him consider anglicizing his last name. He has landed roles in movies such as Elliot Loves (2012), Daddy's Boy (2016), The Pretenders (2018), and as the lead officer in a 2014 episode of TV series The Blacklist. Porowski was also featured in the 2015 short docudrama about the Vinnytsia massacre, To My Father, as Adam Bandrowski. The short film was part of the 2016 Cannes Film Festival's Short Film Corner.

In the meantime, he worked in food service to cover his rent, first working as a busboy at a family-run Polish restaurant. He worked his way up in the restaurant industry, working as a waiter and sommelier, eventually managing the sushi restaurant BondSt.

In December 2017, it was announced that Porowski was hired as the food and wine expert in the Netflix revival of Queer Eye, which began airing in February 2018.

In April 2018, Porowski signed a deal with Houghton Mifflin Harcourt for his first cookbook, released in Spring 2019. In June 2018, he announced that he would be opening The Village Den, a fast-casual restaurant in New York City's West Village. Additionally, Porowski deals vintage furniture.

On September 10, 2018, Porowski alongside co-hosts of Queer Eye received an Emmy for Outstanding Structured Reality Program.

Porowski was featured in Taylor Swift's "You Need to Calm Down" music video, released on June 17, 2019.

In November 2019, he was named Sexiest Reality Star by People magazine.

In June 2021, Porowski announced he is part of the new Equaversity Foundation, established to organize international fundraising to support the LGBT+ community in Poland.

Personal life
He once lived in the same neighborhood as Ted Allen, the original Queer Eye food and wine expert and current host of Food Network cooking competition Chopped. The two became friends, and for a time Porowski worked for Allen and his husband, designer Barry Rice, as their assistant, frequently cooking for the couple and helping them put together events and catering in their home.

Porowski states that his sexuality is "a little more fluid along the spectrum" and prefers not to label himself. He dated graphic artist Joey Krietemeyer for more than seven years before announcing their split in October 2018.

In 2019, Porowski and his Queer Eye costar Jonathan Van Ness set up a joint Instagram account, and posted seemingly romantic photographs. They later clarified that it was in jest.

Since 2019, Porowski has been dating advertising executive Kevin Harrington.

Bibliography
Antoni in the Kitchen (2019)
Antoni: Let's Do Dinner (2021)

Filmography

Film

Television and web

Music videos

References

External links

Living people
1984 births
Canadian expatriates in the United States
Canadian male film actors
Canadian male television actors
Canadian male voice actors
Canadian people of Polish descent
Canadian television personalities
Concordia University alumni
Canadian gay actors
Male actors from Montreal
Neighborhood Playhouse School of the Theatre alumni
Television personalities from Montreal
21st-century Canadian LGBT people
People from Raleigh County, West Virginia
Sexually fluid men
Anglophone Quebec people